Thomas Jefferson Humes (February 14, 1849 – November 9, 1904) was an American politician who served as the Mayor of Seattle from 1897 to 1904.

Born in Indiana, he was Assistant United States District Attorney in Kansas and served two terms in the Kansas legislature before moving to Seattle in 1882. He practiced law there, became a Judge of the Superior Bench, and at the height of the Yukon Gold Rush was appointed to fill out a term as the city's mayor, after which he successfully ran twice for re-election to that post. He was an "open city" mayor (generally tolerant of "vice") but was nonetheless praised at the time of his death as "an honest man" by the prominent Presbyterian minister Mark A. Matthews. "His mistakes," wrote Matthews, "were due largely to his surroundings, and not to the inclinations of his own heart."

References

1849 births
1904 deaths
Mayors of Seattle
Washington (state) Republicans